Adamawa are a breed of cattle indigenous to Adamawa, Nigeria. They are a multipurpose breed, used as a draught animal, and for beef and dairy production. The breed makes up 2% of Nigeria's total herd.
This breed resembles white Fulani or bunaji having a medium to large size, with respect to horn medium size and also crescent in shape. The hump is pendulous in shape which is the main characteristics that differentiate it from white Fulani.

References

Cattle breeds
Cattle breeds originating in Nigeria
Draught cattle breeds